Pinguitrema is a genus of trematodes in the family Opecoelidae.

Species
Pinguitrema lobatum Siddiqi & Cable, 1960
Pinguitrema multilobatum (Travassos, Freitas & Burnheim, 1966) [emend. Gibson, 1976] Cribb, 2005

References

Opecoelidae
Plagiorchiida genera